The following is a list of baseball stadiums in the Philippines, ordered by capacity.

Current stadiums

Future stadiums

See also
List of football stadiums in the Philippines
List of indoor arenas in the Philippines
List of long course swimming pools in the Philippines
Baseball in the Philippines

Baseball venues in the Philippines
Baseball in the Philippines